Ararat is a village in the Ararat Municipality of the Ararat Province of Armenia, located 14 km south of the provincial centre Artashat. In the 2011 census, the village had a population of 7,609.

It hosted to the first CYMA – Canadian Youth Mission to Armenia led by Ronald Alepian in 1993. The village is home to the Vazgen Sargsyan House-Museum.

Famous natives
Vazgen Sargsyan, assassinated Prime Minister of Armenia.
Aram Sargsyan, former Prime Minister of Armenia.

References 

Report of the results of the 2001 Armenian Census

Populated places in Ararat Province
Erivan Governorate
Yazidi populated places in Armenia